Richard Philip Lewis (born June 29, 1947) is an American stand-up comedian and actor.

He came to prominence as a stand-up comedian in the 1980s and became known for his dark, neurotic and self-deprecating humor.

As an actor he is known for co-starring with Jamie Lee Curtis in the sitcom Anything but Love, for playing the role of Prince John in the film Robin Hood: Men in Tights and for his recurring role as a semi-fictionalized version of himself in HBO's Curb Your Enthusiasm.

Early life
Lewis was born in Brooklyn, New York, and raised in Englewood, New Jersey. His family is Jewish, but not especially religious. His father, Bill (d. 1971), was co-owner of Ambassador Caterers in nearby Teaneck, New Jersey, and his mother, Blanche, was an actress in community theatre. Lewis is the youngest of three siblings – his brother was older than him by 6 years, and his sister by 9. Lewis's father's catering business kept his father very busy, and his siblings had both left home by the 1960s, leaving Lewis at home alone with his mother, with whom he did not get along. Lewis told The Washington Post in 2014 that he suspected that his birth had been a mistake.

Lewis was known for being the class clown and causing trouble in school. He graduated from Dwight Morrow High School in 1965 and attended Ohio State University where he attained a degree in marketing.

Career

Lewis first tried stand-up at an open-mic in Greenwich Village in 1971. He began writing and regularly performing stand-up comedy in 1972, while working as a copywriter for an advertising agency by day. He was discovered by comedian David Brenner, while performing in Greenwich Village. Brenner helped Lewis's career by introducing him to the comedy clubs in Los Angeles and getting Lewis his first appearance on The Tonight Show. By the mid-1970s, Lewis had appeared on The Tonight Show Starring Johnny Carson and publications such as the New York Daily News and New York Magazine were naming him one of the "new breed" or "class" of comedians, along with such names as Robert Klein, Lily Tomlin, Richard Pryor, George Carlin, Andy Kaufman, Richard Belzer and Elayne Boosler. His influences are Buster Keaton, Woody Allen, Lenny Bruce and Richard Pryor.

Lewis is known for dark comedy, self-deprecation and for frank discussions of his many neuroses as well as his struggles with alcoholism and drug addiction. He is noted for wearing all-black attire and for pacing and gesticulating wildly during his stand-up act. In his early days he was also known for bringing taped-together sheets from a legal pad to his performances, that he would lay across the floor in front of him to remind him of joke premises and topics he wished to cover during his performance.

Lewis made his screen acting debut in Diary of a Young Comic, a 90 minute film that aired on NBC in 1979 in the timeslot normally reserved for episodes of Saturday Night Live. A satirical look at the Hollywood scene, Lewis stars in the film as Billy Gondola (born Gondolstein), a young Jewish comedian who leaves New York City to find fame in Los Angeles. The film's script was co-written by Lewis and Bennett Tramer and was adapted from a story written by Gary Weis, who also served as the film's director. The film features Bill Macy as Billy's father, Michael Lerner as his agent, and Stacy Keach as a landlord. Performers George Jessel, Dom DeLuise, Nina van Pallandt and Gary Mule Deer make appearances in the film as themselves.

Lewis gained much wider exposure in the 1980s and 1990s with numerous appearances on talk shows such as The Tonight Show, both Late Night and the Late Show with David Letterman, and The Howard Stern Show He also produced the comedy specials I'm in Pain, which aired on Showtime in 1985, followed by I'm Exhausted, I'm Doomed and Richard Lewis: The Magical Misery Tour, which all aired on HBO in 1988, 1990 and 1997 respectively. From 1988 to 1992 he co-starred with Jamie Lee Curtis on the sitcom Anything but Love. He also starred on the short-lived sitcoms Daddy Dearest with Don Rickles in 1993 and Hiller and Diller with Kevin Nealon in 1998. He played Prince John in the 1993 film Robin Hood: Men in Tights, and starred a struggling alcoholic and drug addict, in the 1995 drama film Drunks, a film that also featured performances from Faye Dunaway, George Martin, Parker Posey, Howard Rollins, Spalding Gray and Dianne Wiest and was based on Gary Lennon's play Blackout. Lewis also appeared in the 1995 drama film Leaving Las Vegas and the 1997 romantic comedy Hugo Pool.

Into the 2000s, Lewis had recurring roles as a B movie producer on the sitcom Rude Awakening and as Rabbi Richard Glass on the family drama series 7th Heaven. Lewis also had a recurring role on the sitcom Curb Your Enthusiasm as Richard Lewis, a semi-autobiographical version of himself. Lewis first met the show's star and creator, Larry David, at summer camp in Cornwall-on-Hudson, New York when they were 12 years old – Lewis claimed that at the time they hated each other. The two comedians also happened to be born three days apart in the same hospital. The pair met again just over a decade later while performing stand-up in New York and became friends. Having appeared on the series since its first episode, it was confirmed in 2021 that Lewis would not be returning to the show in its 11th season, due to pain Lewis was experiencing in relation to back and shoulder issues and multiple surgeries. However Lewis later confirmed via Twitter that he was convinced by David to return for one episode. Lewis also told GQ in October 2021 that he hoped that Curb Your Enthusiasm would return for more seasons so that he could once again play a more regular role on the show.

Recognition

GQ magazine included Lewis on their list of "The 20th Century’s Most Influential Humorists", and Lewis was ranked #45 on Comedy Central's list of "100 Greatest Standups of All Time" released in 2004.

In 2006, The Yale Book of Quotations included an entry for the expression "the __ from hell" (as in "the night from hell", "the date from hell". etc.,) that was attributed Lewis. Lewis also petitioned the editors of Bartlett's Familiar Quotations to include the idiom, which was also worked into the plot of Curb Your Enthusiasm during the episode "The Nanny from Hell." Lewis's lawyer sent some video tapes of Lewis using the phrase to Bartlett's general editor Justin Kaplan. Bartlett's declined, stating that the expression had predated Lewis's first taped broadcast. In response, Lewis told Entertainment Weekly that he traces popular usage of the line back to his early days on David Letterman's show.

Personal life

Lewis met Joyce Lapinsky in 1998 at a Ringo Starr album release party, while Lapinsky was working in music publishing. The pair were engaged in 2004 and married the following year.

Discussions of Lewis's battles with anxiety and depression, and his multiple therapy sessions, have been a fixture of his comedy. He has also stated in interviews that he suffers from an eating disorder due to body dysmorphia.

Lewis has been open about his recovery from alcohol and drug abuse, having been a user of both cocaine and crystal meth. His addictions worsened into the 1990s, prompting Lewis to stop performing stand-up from 1991 to 1994. In a 1995 interview with the Santa Maria Times, Lewis discussed how John Candy's death in 1994 caused him to reflect upon his own life and career. The two starred together in Candy's last film, the Western-themed comedy film Wagons East. In later interviews, Lewis stated that he got sober in 1994 after winding up in a hospital emergency room due to a cocaine overdose.

Lewis published his memoir in 2000, titled The Other Great Depression. The book was reissued in 2008 with an added afterword where Lewis reflected further on his continued struggles with addiction. In 2015 he followed this up with the book Reflections From Hell: Richard Lewis' Guide on How Not to Live, which contains Lewis's commentary and observations in the form of one-liners and other comedic premises, interspersed with images created by artist Carl Nicholas Titolo.

Lewis has struggled with health issues resulting in multiple surgeries. In 2016 he shattered his right hand after falling from his roof, in 2019 he had back surgery related to acute back pain, and in early 2020 he shattered his shoulder, resulting in yet more surgery. In 2020 it was revealed that Lewis had endured great pain during the shooting of Curb Your Enthusiasm and in 2021 he announced that he would only be returning for one episode of the 11th season, but hoped to appear more regularly in any potential subsequent seasons.

Filmography

Film

Television

Awards and nominations

References

External links
 Official site
 

1947 births
Living people
American male film actors
American stand-up comedians
American male television actors
Dwight Morrow High School alumni
Jewish American male actors
Male actors from New Jersey
Male actors from New York City
Ohio State University alumni
People from Englewood, New Jersey
20th-century American comedians
21st-century American comedians
20th-century American male actors
21st-century American male actors
Comedians from New York City
Jewish American male comedians
21st-century American Jews